Decommissioning in Northern Ireland was a process in the Belfast Agreement as part of the Northern Ireland peace process. Under the Belfast Agreement, all paramilitary groups fighting in the Troubles would decommission. Decommissioning was a defining issue in the effort to negotiate peace in Northern Ireland.

Belfast Agreement/Good Friday Agreement

The Belfast Agreement, or Good Friday Agreement, was signed in Belfast on 10 April 1998 (Good Friday) by the British and Irish governments and endorsed by most Northern Ireland political parties.

It contained provisions for a government involving both Catholics and Protestants, whose traditional aspirations, expressed as nationalism on one side and unionism on the other, had often clashed over the years. The Agreement recognised the legitimacy of both aspirations. One of the provisions of the Agreement was that the parties agree to collectively use their influence to achieve decommissioning within two years, by May 2000.

Independent International Commission on Decommissioning

The Independent International Commission on Decommissioning (IICD) was established to oversee the decommissioning. Its objective was to facilitate the decommissioning of firearms, ammunition and explosives.

Decommissioning problems
Into late 2001, the Provisional Irish Republican Army (IRA) was reluctant to disarm. The IRA refused to disarm because they said that the British government had reneged on its side of the bargain, by watering down the reforms of the Royal Ulster Constabulary proposed by the Patten Commission, and by failing to pull troops out of Northern Ireland.

After the original deadline for decommissioning – May 2000 – passed, the Independent International Commission on Decommissioning set 30 June 2001. That date passed as well without full disarmament.

The crisis hit its climax in July 2001 as David Trimble, the Ulster Unionist Party leader, resigned as first minister of the power-sharing Northern Ireland Executive in protest against the IRA failure to redeem its pledge to put its weapons "completely and verifiably beyond use" (he was later re-elected). The peace process was on the brink of collapse again after the Provisional IRA failed to convince the UK Government or the Ulster Unionists that they had made "sufficient progress towards decommissioning".

Breakthrough
On 7 August 2001, the IRA agreed on a method of destroying its arsenal. Tony Blair, Prime Minister of the United Kingdom at the time, described the breakthrough as "significant" and "historic". General John de Chastelain of Canada, chairman of the Independent International Commission on Decommissioning, said the proposals had been accepted by the panel as ones that would "put IRA arms completely and verifiably beyond use." The Ulster Unionists had said they would no longer take part in the Northern Ireland Assembly if the IRA did not begin disarming. The announcement came after meetings between the commission and a representative of the IRA.

During the process of decommissioning the Democratic Unionist Party demanded that the IRA release photographs of the decommissioning process in order to satisfy the unionist "man in the street". The IRA rejected these claims, claiming it would amount to "humiliation" , and that two clergymen would oversee the process instead.

In June 2009, both the Ulster Volunteer Force and Red Hand Commando announced that they had completed a process of decommissioning. The UDA said it had started a process that would lead to the destruction of all its arms. Originally, both organisations had refused to decommission, claiming that copying the IRA's action would amount to "dancing to their tune".

Timeline
10 April 1998 (Good Friday): Belfast Agreement is signed, which agrees to have all paramilitary groups in Northern Ireland decommission by May 2000.
May 2000: Deadline to disarm passes. Independent International Commission on Decommissioning agrees on a new deadline, 30 June 2001.
30 June 2001: Deadline to disarm passes.
July 2001: Ulster Unionist leader David Trimble resigns as First Minister because the Provisional Irish Republican Army (IRA) refuses to disarm.
7 August 2001: The IRA agrees on a method to decommission.

See also
Colombian peace process

References

History of Northern Ireland
1990s in Northern Ireland
2000s in Northern Ireland
Northern Ireland peace process
Military disbanding and disarmament